Curassanthura bermudensis is a species of isopod crustacean in the family Leptanthuridae, endemic to Bermuda. It was described in 1985 by Johann Wägele and Angelika Brandt on the basis of a single immature specimen.

References

Cymothoida
Endemic fauna of Bermuda
Hamilton Parish
Taxonomy articles created by Polbot
Crustaceans described in 1985